The Capture of Baghdad by the Ottoman Army under Murad IV occurred on 14 January 1624, which was part of the ongoing war between Sultan Murad IV against Shah Abbas I.

See also
 Treaty of Nasuh Pasha
 Treaty of Serav
 List of conflicts in the Middle East

References
 
 Ghafouri Ali History of the Iran's battles, from the Medes up to today 2009 .
 Asadollah Matoufi 4000 years history of Iran army, Persian title: Tārīkh-i chahār hazār sālah-i artish-i Īrān 2003 .
 

Ottoman–Persian Wars
Military history of Baghdad
Conflicts in 1624
Early Modern history of Iraq
1624 in Asia
17th century in Iran
1624 in the Ottoman Empire
Ottoman history of Baghdad
Wars involving Safavid Iran